He Hongshan (born April 10, 1987), also known as Viva Ho, is a Chinese actress and model. She rose to prominence for her lead role in youth drama Back in Time, and subsequently appeared in a number of television series including Above The Clouds (2017),  The Evolution of Our Love (2018) and Ruyi's Royal Love in the Palace (2018).

Early life and education
She was born in Chongqing on April 10, 1987. She graduated from the Chongqing College of Humanities, Science & Technology.

Acting career
In 2008, she made her film debut with a small role in Ah Qiang in the Street. She then got a small role in the biographical television series What a Big Tree (2009).

She remained relatively unknown, until she got the lead role in Back in Time (2014), a youth drama adapted from Jiuyehui's novel of the same title. 
Following the airing of the series, He gained recognition. He then co-starred in the romance television series The Third Name of Love, and joined the main cast of Under One Roof.

Her first main role in a movie came with the Easy Life (2016) based on the novel Riot in Chang'an City by Han Han. He then played the one of the lead roles in the period drama Sisters.

She became widely known to audiences with the modern romance drama Above The Clouds (2017). That same year, she participated in The Liquidator, a suspense crime film directed by Xu Jizhou and based on the novel Evil Minds: City Light written by Lei Mi.

In 2018, She co-starred in the romance drama The Evolution of Our Love. She then played a key supporting role in the historical television series Ruyi's Royal Love in the Palace, which gained her more recognition.

In 2019, She starred as the female lead in the historical television series Legend of the Phoenix, alongside Xu Zhengxi. She was also cast in the role of Ah Zi in the wuxia television series Demi-Gods and Semi-Devils, based on the novel of the same title by Jin Yong.

He Hong Shan was noted for having portrayed a prominent number of villains during her career, so much so that some of her fans personally asked her to not take any more villainous roles in her future works.

Filmography

Film

Television series

Awards and nominations

References

External links

1987 births
Living people
Actresses from Chongqing
21st-century Chinese actresses
Chinese film actresses
Chinese television actresses